Frédéric Chopin's Waltz in E major is one of his lesser known waltzes, discovered in his folder containing musical works that he did not want to be published.

It was written in 1829 and published in 1861. It was the second of Chopin's posthumously published waltzes not to be given a posthumous opus number. (The first was the Waltz in E minor.) It appears in the Chopin National Edition as WN 18, Brown's catalogue as B. 44, in Kobylańska's catalogue as KK IVa/12, and in Chomiński's as P1/12.

Form 
7-part rondo form as follows:

A-B-A-C-A-B-A,

where the A's are each in E major, the B's are each in G-sharp minor, and the C is in A major.

External links 
 
 , Iskra Mantcheva

Waltzes by Frédéric Chopin
1830 compositions
Compositions in E major
Compositions by Frédéric Chopin published posthumously